Schweiger is a German surname derived from the verb schweigen ("to be silent").  
It originated as a nickname given to a silent, quiet, or taciturn person. Modern variants of the surname include Schwager, Schwaiger, Schweigert and Schweigerdt.

 Heinrich Schweiger (1931-2009),  Austrian actor
 Til Schweiger, German actor and film director
 Luna Schweiger (born 1997), German actress
 Lilli Schweiger (born 1998), German actress
 Emma Schweiger (born 2002), German actress
 Torsten Schweiger (born 1968), German politician

German-language surnames